The Sadness is a 2021 Taiwanese body horror film written and directed by Canadian filmmaker Rob Jabbaz in his feature film directorial debut. It stars Berant Zhu and Regina as a Taiwanese couple who attempt to reunite amidst a viral pandemic that turns people into homicidal maniacs.

Produced by Machi Xcelsior Studios and producer David Barker, The Sadness received a theatrical release in Taiwan on 22 January 2021. The film premiered internationally at the 74th Locarno International Film Festival in Switzerland on 12 August 2021.

Plot
In modern-day Taiwan, medical experts and government officials butt heads over the "Alvin" virus, a flu-like infection. The government has refused to take large-scale measures to prevent the transmission of Alvin, and many ordinary people doubt that the virus exists at all. However, some virologists fear that it has the potential to mutate and cause serious illness.

Jim and Kat, a young couple in Taipei, pass a bloody crime scene while driving to a train station. Jim drops Kat off at the station, and then goes to a nearby cafe. There, a bloodied older woman with darkened eyes assaults other customers, spitting thick mucus on one and burning an employee with hot cooking oil. The man she spat on attacks another customer. She chases Jim into the street, where she is run over by a car driven by a man with the same darkened eyes and crazed expression. Jim flees back to his apartment on foot, chased by the infected locals. He texts Kat to stay where she is, promising to rescue her. A neighbor then attacks him, cutting off two of his fingers with garden shears. Jim fends off his neighbor and manages to escape, using a cloth to try to cover his injury.

Meanwhile, Kat's train is attacked by two infected men who stab passengers with knives and infect others, including a middle-aged Businessman who has confessed his fascination with her. As other infected passengers slaughter the others, Kat escapes from the train with Molly, a woman who was stabbed in the eye by the Businessman. The Businessman pursues them, armed with an axe.

Kat and Molly arrive at the hospital, which is overrun with those who have been harmed by the infected. The government broadcasts an emergency message vowing to take control of the situation, but an infected general then kills the president with a grenade. The hospital patients begin to panic, distracting the police officers there, just as the Businessman and other infected locals break through the doors. Kat escapes into a stairwell as the Businessman rapes Molly's eye wound, infecting her.

Jim escapes to the outskirts of town, passing scenes of sadism along the way. He manages to contact Kat, who tells him where she is. As they talk, he begins to cry, and hallucinates that a discarded mannequin head begins to lap up his blood and sweat—signs that he is infected. 

Elsewhere, the Businessman continues his pursuit of Kat through the hospital's off-limits hallways, but she crushes his head with a fire extinguisher. Kat is then rescued by Dr. Wong, who has been hiding in the maternity ward. Wong explains that he attempted to find the cure for the Alvin virus, which — in its mutated form — connects the parts of the brain that govern sex and aggression. Wong also theorizes that the reason the infected cry is because they are fully aware of the terrible things they do but are completely unable to stop, likening it to resisting the urge to blink. 

When Kat finds an infected baby in a medical waste bin, Wong injects her with a serum of the virus to test if she is immune to it. He admits that he had conducted similar tests on the babies who had been abandoned in the ward, but all of them had become infected; Wong was forced to euthanize them. If Kat becomes infected, he will kill her too; if not, she holds the key to stopping the virus's spread. Kat manages to text her location to Jim, who has just arrived at the hospital. Realizing she is immune to the virus, Wong calls for a military helicopter, intending to take her to a safe location. He warns her that without him, she will not be rescued by the soldiers.

As they make their way to the roof, two infected attack them. Wong manages to kill them but is wounded. Jim then arrives and, after a struggle, kills a now infected Wong, who admits with his last breath to having enjoyed killing the babies.

Kat realizes that Jim is infected and locks him outside the stairwell to the roof. Jim tells her that being infected feels wonderful and that he can think of no more loving act than to mutilate and kill her. Tearful and psychologically broken, Kat flees up the stairs and through a door leading to the roof. Shortly after she exits, the sound of automatic gunfire becomes audible. Sitting against the stairwell gate, Jim dies with a grin upon his face.

Cast
 Berant Zhu as Jim
 Regina Lei as Kat (as Regina Lei)
 Tzu-Chiang Wang as The Businessman
 Emerson Tsai as Warren Liu
 Wei-Hua Lan as Dr. Alan Wong
 Ralf Chiu as Mr. Lin
 Lue-Keng Huang as Kevin, MRT Employee
 Ying-Ru Chen as Molly

Production
The Sadness features cinematography by Jie-Li Bai, and was shot on Red Digital Cinema "Monstro" cameras with Arri "Signature Prime" lenses.  Principal photography lasted 28 days.

The film's special effects were handled by IF SFX Art Maker. The effects crew spent up to three months producing a number of practical artificial heads—including some that could be made to explode or spray blood—prostheses, organs, and other props. Production designer Liu Chin-Fu oversaw the film's set design, which included a subway car and a hospital.

Release
The Sadness was released in theatres in Taiwan on 22 January 2021. It had its international premiere at the 74th Locarno International Film Festival in Switzerland on 12 August 2021. It was screened at the 25th Fantasia International Film Festival in Montreal, Canada, in August 2021, as well as at Fantastic Fest in Austin, Texas, in September 2021.

Raven Banner Entertainment acquired the worldwide distribution rights to the film.

In April 2022, it was confirmed that the film would begin streaming on Shudder on May 12, 2022.

Reception

Critical response 
The Sadness received an overwhelmingly positive reception from critics upon release. 

Film Threats Alex Saveliev awarded The Sadness a score of 10 out of 10, calling it, "Some kind of genius, propelling ahead with a vicious force, full throttle, both embracing and disregarding convention." Saveliev praised the style of the film, observing that "it's made with filmmaking finesse, elegantly structured, with a gorgeous electronic score helping to drive the narrative. Obvious allusions to the current pandemic resonate, skillfully avoiding the 'overwrought' trap." Han Cheung of the Taipei Times called the film a "slickly-produced gorefest", noting the "fast-paced action and not-so-subtle digs at the government and humanity" but lamenting "the oversimplified plot and lack of attention to storytelling nuances and details".

Phuong Le of The Guardian gave the film 3/5 stars, writing: "Unencumbered by a need to explicitly spell out any overarching message... The Sadness accentuates gore’s tactile yuckiness, utilising practical effects in a fashion that recalls retro exploitation flicks." She criticized the film's use of sexual violence as "a desensitising misstep", and added: "Nevertheless the assured command of style situates Jabbaz as an impressive new voice in horror cinema."

Awards 
At the 2021 Fantasia International Film Festival, The Sadness won the award for Best Film in the New Flesh competition for first features.

Fantastic Fest awarded The Sadness Best Picture and Best Director in its 2021 horror competition.

References

External links
 

Body horror films
2021 films
2021 horror thriller films
Taiwanese horror films
Taiwanese thriller films
Films about viral outbreaks
Splatter films
Films about mutants
Films about murder
Films about rape
Shudder (streaming service) original programming